308 or .308 may refer to:

308, year 308 AD
308 BC
308 (number)
.308 caliber, firearms cartridges with bullet diameters of 0.308 inches (7.62 mm)
.308 Winchester, a popular rifle cartridge
British Rail Class 308, an electric multiple unit train
Peugeot 308, an automobile
Several cars produced by Ferrari, including the Ferrari 308 GT4 and the Ferrari 308 GTB/GTS
USS William Jones (DD-308) warship
The 308 cubic inch Holden V8 engine